Field Marshal Edwin Noel Westby Bramall, Baron Bramall,  (18 December 1923 – 12 November 2019) was a British Army officer. He served as Chief of the General Staff, the professional head of the British Army, between 1979 and 1982, and as Chief of the Defence Staff, professional head of the British Armed Forces, from 1982 to 1985.

Early life and family
Bramall was born on 18 December 1923 in Tonbridge, Kent, England, the son of Major Edmund Haselden Bramall (1889−1964) (son of Ernest Edward Bramall (1864–1938), managing director of Desford Colliery, Leicester) by his wife Katherine Bridget Westby. He was educated at Eton College.

In 1949 he married Dorothy Avril Wentworth Vernon, by whom he had one son and one daughter. His elder brother Ashley Bramall was a barrister, Labour politician and Leader of the Inner London Education Authority.

Military career
Bramall was commissioned as a second lieutenant in the King's Royal Rifle Corps on 22 May 1943, during the Second World War. He took part in the Normandy landings in June 1944 and served with the 2nd Battalion of his regiment in Northwest Europe during the later stages of the war, receiving the Military Cross on 1 March 1945, shortly before the end of World War II in Europe.

Bramall was promoted to lieutenant on 18 June 1946 and served in the occupation of Japan from 1946, before becoming an instructor at the School of Infantry in 1949. Promoted to captain on 18 December 1950, he was stationed in the Middle East from 1953 and was then promoted to major on 18 December 1957. Continuing his military career, he served two years as an instructor at the Staff College, Camberley, from 1958, and then was appointed to serve on Lord Mountbatten's staff in 1963.

Appointed an Officer of the Order of the British Empire in the 1965 New Year Honours, and promoted to lieutenant colonel on 25 January 1965, he was appointed Commanding Officer of the 2nd Green Jackets, The King's Royal Rifle Corps: the Battalion was deployed to Borneo during the Indonesia–Malaysia confrontation in the first half of 1966 where his actions earned him a mention in despatches. He was given command of the 5th (Airportable) Infantry Brigade in November 1967 with promotion to brigadier on 31 December 1967.

Bramall was made General Officer Commanding the 1st Division on 6 January 1972, with the substantive rank of major general from 6 April 1972, Commander of British Forces in Hong Kong with the rank of lieutenant general on 1 December 1973 and appointed a Knight Commander of the Order of the Bath in the 1974 New Year Honours. He went on to be Commander-in-Chief, UK Land Forces on 15 May 1976 and was promoted to full general on 25 June 1976.

He was appointed Vice-Chief of the Defence Staff (Personnel and Logistics) on 20 March 1978, advanced to Knight Grand Cross of the Order of the Bath in the 1979 New Year Honours, before being made ADC General to the Queen on 26 June 1979 and appointed Chief of the General Staff on 14 July 1979. In this role he strongly supported the plan in May 1982 to land troops at San Carlos Water and then advance rapidly from those positions at the early stages of the Falklands War.

Bramall was promoted to field marshal on 1 August 1982, and appointed Chief of the Defence Staff on 1 October that year. In this capacity he developed the concept of the "Fifth Pillar" pulling together the activities of defence attachés to form a structure for intervention in smaller countries. He retired in November 1985. He was also Colonel of the 3rd Battalion the Royal Green Jackets from December 1973, Colonel of the 2nd King Edward VII's Own Gurkha Rifles (The Sirmoor Rifles) from 14 September 1976 and Colonel Commandant of the Special Air Service from 19 May 1985.

Later career

Following his retirement from active military duty Bramall served as Lord Lieutenant of Greater London from 1986 to 1998. He was invested as a Knight of the Garter in 1990. He served as President of the Marylebone Cricket Club (MCC) in 1988. and was an Honorary Life Vice President of the MCC. His other interests included painting and travel and he was a Vice-President of the welfare organisation SSAFA Forces Help.

Bramall was created a life peer as Baron Bramall of Bushfield in the County of Hampshire in 1987. Bramall spoke out in the House of Lords against the involvement of the United Kingdom in the Second Iraq War warning that "unlike naked aggression, terrorism cannot be defeated by massive military means" but by "competent protection and positive diplomacy".

On 27 August 2006 it was reported that Bramall, then aged 82, hit Lord Janner, then 78, after Bramall made what witnesses claim were a series of "anti-Israel" comments during an argument over the Lebanon conflict. Janner sought the advice of fellow peers about how and whether to make a formal complaint against Bramall, before deciding to accept an apology after which Janner said the matter was resolved.

On 25 April 2013 Bramall retired from service in the House of Lords. He died at the age of 95 on 12 November 2019.

Operation Midland

Bramall was one of several senior establishment figures targeted by Carl Beech, a convicted perjurer. Following invented complaints by Beech, on 4 March 2015, officers of the Metropolitan Police searched Bramall's house near Farnham as part of the Operation Midland child sexual abuse investigation. Bramall released a statement after the search, saying: "Categorically, never have I had a connection or anything to do with the matters being investigated." On 30 April 2015, under the same investigation, Lord Bramall attended a police station in Surrey by appointment. While officers interviewed him for two hours, they did not charge or arrest him.

On 15 January 2016, the police confirmed that there was insufficient evidence to bring any charges and he would face no further action. Bramall's wife Lady Bramall died in July 2015, without knowing that he would not be charged. In October 2016, after what The Guardian described as a "chorus of calls" for an official apology to Lord Bramall, the Metropolitan Police Commissioner Sir Bernard Hogan-Howe apologised to Bramall. On 1 September 2017, it was reported that the Metropolitan Police had paid substantial compensation to Bramall for having raided his home "after accepting that the searches had been unjustified and should never have taken place."

Beech went on trial for 12 counts of perverting the course of justice and one count of fraud in May 2019. He was convicted on all charges, and was sentenced to 18 years in prison in July 2019.  The court was told that "immeasurable distress" had been caused to those falsely accused as well as "obvious reputational damage". Bramall said of the ordeal: "I can honestly say however I was never as badly wounded in all my time in the military as I have been by the allegations made by [Beech] that formed the basis of Operation Midland."

Arms

References

Bibliography

External links

Imperial War Museum Interview

|-

|-
 

|-

|-

1923 births
2019 deaths
Edwin
British Army personnel of World War II
British field marshals
Army
Chiefs of the Defence Staff (United Kingdom)
Chiefs of the General Staff (United Kingdom)
Crossbench life peers
English victims of crime
King's Royal Rifle Corps officers
Knights Grand Cross of the Order of the Bath
Knights of the Garter
Knights of the Order of St John
Lord-Lieutenants of Greater London
Officers of the Order of the British Empire
People educated at Eton College
People from Tonbridge
Presidents of the Marylebone Cricket Club
Recipients of the Military Cross
Royal Green Jackets officers
Academics of the Staff College, Camberley
Military personnel from Kent
Life peers created by Elizabeth II